Phalonidia trabalea is a species of moth of the family Tortricidae. It is found in Brazil in the states of Pará and Goias.

References

Moths described in 1994
Phalonidia